Valeriy Anatolyevich Spitsyn (born 5 December 1965 in Magnitogorsk, Chelyabinsk Oblast) is a retired male race walker from Russia.

International competitions

References

1965 births
Living people
People from Magnitogorsk
Sportspeople from Chelyabinsk Oblast
Russian male racewalkers
Olympic athletes of Russia
Olympic athletes of the Unified Team
Athletes (track and field) at the 1992 Summer Olympics
Athletes (track and field) at the 2000 Summer Olympics
World Athletics Championships athletes for Russia
World Athletics Championships medalists
European Athletics Championships winners
European Athletics Championships medalists
CIS Athletics Championships winners
Russian Athletics Championships winners
World record setters in athletics (track and field)